Marc Dollendorf (born 7 February 1966 in Sankt Vith) is a retired Belgian athlete who specialised in the 400 metres hurdles. He represented his country at the 1996 Summer Olympics as well as four consecutive World Championships starting in 1991.

His personal best in the event is 48.91 seconds set in Atlanta in 1996.  This is the standing national records.

Competition record

References

1966 births
Living people
People from Kontich
Belgian male hurdlers
Olympic athletes of Belgium
Athletes (track and field) at the 1996 Summer Olympics
World Athletics Championships athletes for Belgium
Competitors at the 1991 Summer Universiade
Sportspeople from Antwerp Province